John Joseph Madigan (21 July 196616 June 2020) was an Australian blacksmith and politician. He served as a Senator for Victoria from 2011 to 2016. He was elected to the Senate at the 2010 federal election as a member of the Democratic Labour Party (DLP). He resigned from the DLP to become an independent in September 2014, and later launched "John Madigan's Manufacturing and Farming Party" in 2015.

He failed to be re-elected at the 2016 double dissolution election, and the Manufacturing and Farming Party was voluntarily deregistered on 13 September 2016.

Early life
Born into a Catholic family, Madigan belonged to a youth group run by the National Civic Council founder, B.A. Santamaria, in Melbourne. Madigan was a blacksmith and boilermaker from 1983 to 2011, self-employed in his own engineering workshop in Hepburn Springs, Victoria. He has an apprenticeship in Structural Steel Fabrication from Newport TAFE. He lived in Ballarat and was married with two children.

Politics

Madigan served as vice-president of the Victorian DLP from 2008 to 2009 and was elected to the Senate at the 2010 election. Madigan resigned from the DLP and became an independent Senator on 4 September 2014, citing long-term internal party tensions.

2010 federal election
Madigan won the sixth and last Victorian Senate seat at the 2010 federal election.  The primary DLP vote in Victoria of 2.3 percent (75,000 votes) was boosted to the 14.3 percent quota required by gaining One Nation, Christian Democratic and Building Australia preferences. That gave Madigan a 0.2 percent lead over Steve Fielding of the Family First Party, whose preferences then flowed to Madigan. When the Australian Sex Party candidate was excluded, the DLP gained Liberal Democratic Party preferences, overtaking the third Liberal/National candidate and gaining those preferences to win the last seat. Madigan became the first DLP senator from Victoria since Frank McManus and Jack Little, who were both defeated at the double-dissolution election in 1974.

He took his seat in the Senate on 1 July 2011. The Labor government of the time held 31 seats, eight short of a majority, with the Greens holding nine seats, giving them the balance of power. Madigan's vote was unlikely to be a decider in any Senate division because the votes of Greens bloc, paired with either Labor or the Coalition, were enough to win any Senate vote.

2016 election
Due to a double dissolution of parliament in 2016, Madigan was unable to serve his full term in parliament. The Manufacturing and Farming party supported Madigan and Mark George as Senate candidates for Victoria in the 2016 federal election. He was not re-elected, gaining 0.15% of the total Senate vote in the state. John Madigan's Manufacturing and Farming Party was voluntarily deregistered by the Australian Electoral Commission on 13 September 2016.

Later years and death 
Madigan joined the Australian Country Party in September 2016.

In December 2018, Madigan announced that he had liver and bowel cancer. He died on 16 June 2020, aged 53, at a palliative care facility near his home in Ballarat Victoria Australia . Former prime minister Tony Abbott eulogised Madigan as "a fine representative of a worthy political tradition" with an "old-fashioned sense of courtesy and respect for others".

Political views 
Madigan took a strong stance for implementing refugee and protection conventions and gambling reforms.

Madigan campaigned against wind turbines, chairing the 2015 Select Committee on Wind Turbines, advocating the removal of government incentives from the industry, and promoting the idea of "wind turbine syndrome". From 2011 onward, Madigan's chief of staff was Brendan Gullifer, a journalist and writer who has published articles against wind power.

Madigan described himself as "unashamedly pro-life". As a representative of the DLP, he opposed legislation on same-sex marriage; the sale of public infrastructure; the implementation of a carbon tax (stating "We're not in favour of a carbon tax because we believe it's a tax on people and a tax on life"); and the limiting of weekend trading hours. He addressed the Inaugural Jack Kane Dinner in July 2011, where he advocated Chifley-style protectionist economics.

In his maiden speech to the Senate, Madigan denounced Victoria's "inhumane" abortion laws and committed to help restore Australia's dwindling manufacturing sector. He called for a "good Labor government that will bring something better to the people". He said that the DLP and ALP differed in a number of ways, stating:

Madigan also praised fellow crossbench Senator Nick Xenophon in his maiden speech, saying he had "done his best to address the plight of the Australian worker and the Australian family". He shared views on gambling reform and wind turbines with Xenophon, with the pair helping to establish a Select Committee on Wind Turbines.

References

External links
 Biography: Australian Parliament website
 Maiden Senate speech 25 August 2011: Australian Parliament website
 Summary of parliamentary voting for Senator John Madigan on TheyVoteForYou.org.au

1966 births
Australian blacksmiths
Democratic Labour Party members of the Parliament of Australia
2020 deaths
Members of the Australian Senate
Members of the Australian Senate for Victoria
Australian Roman Catholics
Australian anti-abortion activists
Independent members of the Parliament of Australia
21st-century Australian politicians
Deaths from cancer in Victoria (Australia)